The 2004 Hungarian Grand Prix (officially the Formula 1 Marlboro Magyar Nagydíj 2004) was a Formula One motor race held on 15 August 2004 at the Hungaroring, Mogyoród, Pest, Hungary. It was Race 13 of 18 in the 2004 FIA Formula One World Championship and the 20th Hungarian Grand Prix. The 70-lap race was won from pole position by Michael Schumacher, driving a Ferrari, with teammate Rubens Barrichello second and Fernando Alonso third in a Renault.

The win was Michael Schumacher's twelfth of the season and his seventh in succession, equalling Alberto Ascari's record. The result meant that Schumacher increased his lead in the Drivers' Championship to 38 points over Barrichello. Jenson Button, who finished fifth in the race in his BAR-Honda, remained in third but was mathematically eliminated from the championship. Ferrari's one-two finish meant that they secured their sixth consecutive Constructors' Championship.

Report

Background

Heading into the thirteenth race of the season, Ferrari driver Michael Schumacher led the Drivers' Championship with 110 points, ahead of teammate Rubens Barrichello on 74 points and Jenson Button on 65. Jarno Trulli was fourth with 46 points with his Renault teammate Fernando Alonso in fifth place on 39 points. Ferrari were leading the Constructors' Championship with 184 points; Renault (85 points) and BAR (76) contended for second place with Williams in fourth on 47 points and McLaren were a further ten points adrift in fifth place. Ferrari had dominated the championship; Michael Schumacher had won eleven races for the team, while Trulli had clinched the victory in the Monaco Grand Prix. Barrichello, Button, Alonso, Juan Pablo Montoya and Kimi Räikkönen had finished in second and third positions during the season.

There was one driver change heading into the race. Cristiano da Matta was dropped by Toyota and was replaced by the team's third driver Ricardo Zonta. Da Matta was dropped because of his poor performance relative to teammate Olivier Panis, but remained at the team as a driver and would perform marketing work while Toyota test driver Ryan Briscoe assumed Zonta's former position.

Friday drivers
The bottom 6 teams in the 2003 Constructors' Championship were entitled to run a third car in free practice on Friday. These drivers drove on Friday but did not compete in qualifying or the race.

Classification

Qualifying

Race

Championship standings after the race 
Bold text indicates the World Champions.

Drivers' Championship standings

Constructors' Championship standings

References

External links

Hungarian Grand Prix
Grand Prix
Hungarian Grand Prix
August 2004 sports events in Europe